Bela plicatilis is a species of sea snail, a marine gastropod mollusk in the family Mangeliidae.

According to J.K. Tucker Mangelia plicatilis is a synonym of Haedropleura septangularis (Montagu, G., 1803)

Description

Distribution
This species occurs in the Mediterranean Sea.

References

 G. (2016). Bela plicatilis (Risso, 1826) a valid species (Gastropoda, Conoidea, Mangeliidae). Bollettino Malacologico. 52: 77-78
 Arnaud, P. M., 1978 - Révision des taxa malacologiques méditerrannéens introduits par Antoine Risso Annales du Muséum d'Histoire Naturelle de Nice, "1977"5 101-150

plicatilis